Pulsar is a brand of watch and currently a division of Seiko Watch Corporation of America (SCA). Pulsar was the world's first electronic digital watch. Current Pulsar watches are mostly analog and use the same movements in Seikos such as the 7T62 quartz chronograph movement.

History

In 1970, Pulsar was a brand of the American Hamilton Watch Company which first announced that it was making and bringing the LED watch to market. It was developed jointly by American companies Hamilton and Electro/Data Inc.  In spring 1972, the first Pulsar watch was marketed by Hamilton Watch (the parent company, not the Hamilton Watch Division). With an 18-carat gold case, the world's first all-electronic digital watch was also the first to use a digital display created with light-emitting diodes (LEDs). A button was pressed to display the time. The first Pulsar initially sold for $2,100 ($ in  dollars). In October 1972, the Potpourri segment in the issue of Playboy mentioned the first Pulsar, and included a photo. In 1975, a digital Pulsar with a built-in calculator was released. In 1978, Seiko Corporation acquired the Pulsar brand, it is mid-grade of their product range. By 2020 Seiko has ceased selling its Pulsar in the United Kingdom.

References

External links

 
 Website dedicated to vintage Pulsar watches

Seiko
Watch brands